The London Skolars are a professional rugby league club based at the New River Stadium, Wood Green, Haringey in north London. They were founded in 1995 and have been professional since 2003, operating in the Betfred League 1. They also run an A-team (formerly known as Haringey Hornets) that play in the South Premier Division of the Rugby League Conference.

History

The club was founded by Ian "Hector" McNeil in 1995 as Student Rugby League Old Boys, created for post-university graduates based in London who wished to continue playing competitive rugby league, with a number of ex-student international rugby league players as members. The team originally played at Hackney RFC. The club quickly went "open", drawing not only from players from the student game but also London-based antipodeans and local rugby players.

The club name was changed to London Skolars two years later in 1997, partly to refer humorously to their academic origins but primarily due to a potential sponsorship from Skol lager. After initial success in the London League, in 1997 the club became a founder member of the Southern Conference League (the forerunner to the Rugby League Conference), under the name North London Skolars, and won the inaugural competition. They also moved to New River Stadium at this time. Later in 1997, they entered the National Conference League and were the only club south of Sheffield in the competition for four consecutive seasons.

In 1998 Skolars hosted Strella XIII, the first time a team from Tatarstan had toured Great Britain. During the 1999 season, the Skolars toured Russia, the first time that an amateur club had toured the former Soviet Union.

Skolars first team won the Southern Division of the Rugby League Conference in 2000 and the second team won the London League that same year. The second team won the London League again in 2001.

In 2002 the club applied to join the National Leagues and was accepted, the first club in eighty years to make the transition from the amateur ranks to the professional leagues. The A team joined the Conference and won the London & South Division in its first year.

In 2003, the Skolars first season in National League Two, they finished bottom of the league, but made further progress in 2004. They won the Middlesex 9s whilst the A team won the London League. The club dropped "North" from their name to become London Skolars. The appointment of Latham Tawhai as a full-time coach at the end of the 2005 season marked another step forward in the club's progress.

Tawhai left Skolars at the end of 2007 to become assistant coach at Harlequins RL and was replaced by Tony Benson.

Tony Benson left his job at London Skolars at the end of the season due to the inconvenience of travelling from his home in Leigh, Greater Manchester. Callum Irving took over as head coach at the club, Irving was Tony Benson's number two in the 2008 season. He resigned in July 2009, citing personal reasons. Injured player Jermaine Coleman took over as interim head coach for the remainder of the season. The club appointed its first full-time chief executive officer in 2009, Phillip Browne, who was replaced in 2010 by Howard Kramer. The Skolars finished the 2009 in 10th position of the Championship One table, taking the wooden spoon with just one win all season and five points. London Skolars announced that James Massara, a Hammersmith-born thirty-two-year-old would take the reins as head coach at New River Stadium in 2010. In October 2010 the London Skolars appointed former Harlequins RL player Joe Mbu as their head coach.

In 2013, London finished 4th in the 2013 Championship 1 season. That was the first time they finished in the play-offs in their Championship 1 venture, although they didn't achieve promotion after being knocked out in the semi-finals.

In 2014, Joe Mbu led the Skolars to 7th place out of 9. After a heavy defeat by Swinton Lions in the Challenge Cup at the beginning of the 2015 season, London Skolars released Mbu from his contract on 9 March.

On 18 March 2015, Skolars appointed ex-player and then current Hemel Stags assistant coach Jermaine Coleman as head coach. Coleman in his first season 11th out of 14 teams. Recruiting and retaining strongly, Coleman lead the Skolars to a top 8 playoff place after a 23–22 win over the Gloucestershire All Golds.

2022 squad

2022 transfers

In

Out

Players

Past coaches

 Latham Tawhai 2005–2007
 Tony Benson 2007–08
 Jermaine Coleman 2009
 James Massara 2010
 Joe Mbu 2010–2015
 Jermaine Coleman 2015–2021
 Joe Mbu 2021-present

'A' team
London Skolars run an A team which compete in the South Premier division.

Juniors
Skolars run under-7s,under-9s,under-11s, under-13s under-15s and under-17s teams who all compete in the London Junior League.

Seasons

Honours
League
RFL London League:
Winners (3): 2000, 2001, 2004
Conference South Division:
Winners (2): 2000, 2002
Conference Eastern Division:
Winners (1): 1997

Cups
Conference Challenge Cup:
Winners (1): 2004
Harry Jepson Trophy:
Winners (2): 1997, 2012

Nines
Middlesex 9s:
Winners (1): 2003

References

External links

 
 London Skolars forum on rlfans.com
 National League website
 London Skolars Fans Forums – RugbyLeague.org

 
Rugby clubs established in 1995
English rugby league teams
1995 establishments in England
Rugby league teams in London